Acanthodoris uchidai is a species of sea slug, a dorid nudibranch, a shell-less marine gastropod mollusc in the family Onchidorididae.

Distribution 
This species was described from Daikoku-shima, Akkeshi Bay, Japan.

References

Onchidorididae
Gastropods described in 1935